Garden of Love Light is the debut solo album from R&B-soul-dance-pop songwriter/producer Narada Michael Walden. It featured nine tracks, seven which Walden wrote alone. It was produced by Tom Dowd. The single "Delightful" rose to number 81 on the R&B charts.

Track listing
All songs written by Narada Michael Walden, except where noted.

"White Night" (Walden, Raymond Gomez) 4:57
"Garden of Love Light" 4:55
"Delightful" 4:51
"First Love" 5:52
"Meditation" (lyrics from Sri Chinmoy) 1:38
"The Sun is Dancing" 9:29 (dedicated to Mahavishnu John McLaughlin)
"You Got the Soul" 3:22
"Saint and the Rascal" 4:33
"You Are-Love" (Walden, Cynthia Anderson) 3:12

Personnel
Narada Michael Walden - drums (1-4,6-8), percussion, tympani (1), acoustic piano (2-4,7,9), Fender Rhodes bass (7), vocals (2,3,7,9)
David Sancious - piano (7), Fender Rhodes electric piano (3), Hammond B-3 (3,4), keyboards (1,6,8), Mini-Moog, electric sitar (1)
Don Muro - synthesizers (9)
Ray Gomez (1,2,3,6), Carlos Santana (4), Icarus Johnson (7), Jeff Beck (8) - guitars
Will Lee - bass (1-3,6-9), vocals (3)
Sammy Figueroa - congas (2,3)
Norma Jean Bell - saxophone (3), vocals (3,7)
Michael Gibbs - arrangement and conducting of Perfection Light Symphony (1,4,5,9)
Lois Colin (4,5,9) - harp
Tammy Cynthia Weiss, Carol Shue, Stacy Johns (5) - strings
Patti Scialfa - vocals (3,7)
 Jeff Beck - guitar (8)

Production
Produced by Tom Dowd
Recorded and mixed by Dennis Mackay; additional recording by Jimmy Douglas
Mixed at Trident Studios, London
Mastered by Dennis King at Atlantic Studios

Reference List

External links
Discogs listing

1976 debut albums
Atlantic Records albums
Albums produced by Tom Dowd
Narada Michael Walden albums
Jazz fusion albums by American artists